Senator Ross may refer to:

Members of the Liberian Senate
Joseph J. Ross (1842–1899), Liberian Senator from Sinoe County

Members of the United States Senate
James Ross (Pennsylvania politician) (1762–1847), U.S. Senator from Pennsylvania from 1794 to 1803
Jonathan Ross (senator) (1826–1905), U.S. Senator from Vermont from 1899 to 1900

United States state senate members
Charlie Ross (Mississippi politician) (born 1956), Mississippi State Senate
Edmund G. Ross (1826–1907), Kansas and New Mexico Territory
James E. Ross (1921–1993), Pennsylvania State Senate
John Wilson Ross (1863–1945), Arizona State Senate
Lawrence Sullivan Ross (1838–1898), Texas State Senate
Mike Ross (politician) (born 1961), Arkansas State Senate
Ogden J. Ross (1893–1968), New York State Senate
Quinton Ross (politician) (born 1968), Alabama State Senate
Richard J. Ross (fl. 1970s–2010s), Massachusetts State Senate
Stephen L. Ross (1810s–1891), Tennessee State Senate
Tony Ross (politician) (born 1953), Wyoming State Senate
William Ross (speaker) (died 1830), New York State Senate

Other
Pete Ross, a fictional character appearing in American comic books published by DC Comics